This is a list of Italian football transfers for co-ownership resolutions, for the 2001-02 season, from and to Serie A and Serie B.

According to Article 102 bis of NOIF (Norme Organizzative Interne della F.I.G.C). The co-ownership deal must be confirmed each year. The deal may expired, renewed, bought back or sold outright. Deals that failed to form an agreement after the deadline, will be defined by auction between the 2 clubs. Which the club will submit their bid in a sealed envelope. Non-submission may lead to the rights is free to give to the opposite side. The mother club could sold their rights to third-parties.

Co-ownership

References
general
 
 
specific

Italy
Trans
2001